This is a list of islands of Montenegro. Montenegro's islands are relatively small and they are not as nearly as numerous as in neighbouring Croatia. They are divided in islands on Adriatic sea, and those on Skadar lake:

Adriatic sea
 Ada Bojana
 Katič
 Mamula (former prison-island)
 Sveti Nikola
 Sveta Neđelja
 Sveti Stefan
 Stari Ulcinj
 Žanjic
Bay of Kotor
 Sveti Marko
 Gospa od Milosti
 Ostrvo cvijeća
 Gospa od Škrpjela
 Sveti Đorđe
 Školjic

Lake Skadar
 Vranjina
 Grmožur (former prison-island)
 Lesendro
 Starčevo
 Kom
 Beška
 Moračnik
 Kamenik
 Liponjak
 Krajina archipelago

Records

Largest island - Both Ada Bojana and Vranjina have an area of 4.8 square km.

Largest sea island — Sveti Nikola is about 36 hectares / 90 acres.

Tallest island — Vranjina rises at 303 meters above sea level.

Tallest sea island — Sveti Nikola is 121 meters high. Second-highest is Sveti Marko, at 36 meters.

List of islands

References

 
Lists of landforms of Montenegro
Montenegro